The Keiga people are a sub-ethnic group of the Nuba peoples in the Nuba Mountains of South Kordofan state, in southern Sudan.
The population of this ethnicity likely is below 10,000. They speak Keiga, a Nilo-Saharan language.
The language belongs to the Kadugli–Krongo family.

The Keiga people live north and northwest of Kadugli in South Kurdufan State.
Their tradition says that all Keiga communities originated from Kulu sub-hill in Keiga Tummero hill.
From there, they gradually spread over the present Keiga territory, the four hill communities of Tummero, Luban, al-Khayl, and Dameik. 
The Keiga people practice farming in the rainy season and also raise cattle. They have been in competition for land with Arabs in the area, sometimes escalating into violence.

Keiga people live in two major areas. These areas are Ambong and Koolo. Those who live in Ambong  named themselves as Kayikang ma Ambong i.e. the Keiga of Ambong, while those who live in Koolo named themselves as Kayikang n Koolo i.e. the Keiga of Koolo. The two groups speak Keiga language with different accents and sometimes different words and phrases. The Keiga traditional name is Kayigang as plural and Tayigang for singular but like many names in the Nuba Mountains, Kayigang was altered to be Keiga. The name Ambong in Keiga means Sultanate. Dameek is one of the Ambong village with four hamlets, and historically its name was Roofik which is derived from the name of a Kamda tribe's place called Leinya Ma Roofik. which means the hill of Roofik. The name roofik came to existence when three men and a woman came to Keiga Ambong escaping from the scourge of war as a safe hideaway. The Ambong Sultane welcomed them and put them in that place under his protection. The newcomers were then called KAROOFIK i.e. the roofik people. One good thing in Keiga Sultante is that, it keeps calling those who come to Ambong for any reason with names of the places they came from, just like Jersey and New Jersey. Zealand and New Zealand. So the name Dameek came to existence very new. The Dameek Village although lies in Keiga Ambong area, but the people there commonly speak Dameek language which is far much closer to the Kamda language. It is worth mentioning that Kamda and Keiga tribes are from the very same language family tree. Keiga Ambong people did not come from Keiga Koolo. Instead some Keiga Koolo people for some reasons moved to Keiga Ambong and they were named after Koolo as Kakoolo and there are maternal families living in Ambong till now who claim to be Keiga Ambong and not Keiga Koolo.

See also
Index: Nuba peoples

References

Nuba peoples
Ethnic groups in Sudan

eo:Keigaoj